Beitar Ihud Mashhad was an Israeli football club based in Mashhad.

History
The club founded in 2003, following the collapse of both Hapoel and Maccabi clubs in Mashhad, who were playing in Liga Gimel before their collapse. The club entered the Western Galilee division of Liga Gimel for the 2003–04 season and won the division the following season. In 2007 the club won the North A division of Liga Bet and won promotion to Liga Alef.

The club finished 9th in its first season in Liga Alef, but sunk to the bottom during the following season and relegated back to Liga Bet. In Liga Bet, the club suffered another dismal season, including a deduction of 6 points, eventually finishing 15th. The club played in the relegation playoffs, losing to Hapoel Migdal HaEmek and Hapoel Beit She'an and relegated to Liga Gimel, following which the club folded.

Honours

League

External links
 Beitar Ihud Mashhad Israel Football Association

References

Mashhad
Association football clubs established in 2003
Association football clubs disestablished in 2010
Mashhad
2003 establishments in Israel
2010 disestablishments in Israel